Amantis is a genus of praying mantids native to Asia and the islands of the Pacific Ocean and now belongs to the monotypic tribe Amantini of the subfamily Iridopteryginae.

Species
The following species are recognised in the genus Amantis:
 Amantis aeta Hebard, 1920
 Amantis aliena Beier, 1930
 Amantis basilana Hebard, 1920
 Amantis biroi Giglio-Tos, 1915
 Amantis bolivari Giglio-Tos, 1915
 Amantis fuliginosa Werner, 1931
 Amantis fumosana Giglio-Tos, 1915
 Amantis gestri Giglio-Tos, 1915
 Amantis hainanensis Tinkham, 1937
 Amantis indica Giglio-Tos, 1915
 Amantis irina Saussure, 1870
 Amantis lofaoshanensis Tinkham, 1937
 Amantis longipennis Beier, 1930
 Amantis malayana Westwood, 1889
 Amantis nawai Shiraki, 1908
 Amantis philippina Giglio-Tos, 1915
 Amantis reticulata Haan, 1842 type species (Malesia)
 Amantis saussurei Bolivar, 1897
 Amantis subirina Giglio-Tos, 1915
 Amantis testacea Werner, 1931
 Amantis tristis Werner, 1933
 Amantis vitalisi Werner, 1927

References

 
Mantodea of Asia
Mantodea of Oceania
Iridopteryginae